Barry O'Brien (born 1957) is an American television writer and producer best known as the co-creator of Disney Channel Original Series Hannah Montana. His credits include Happy Days, Perfect Strangers, Hangin' with Mr. Cooper, Judging Amy, and CSI: Miami.

Life

Barry O’Brien was born in San Francisco, California, to a large Irish Catholic family. He attended Terra Linda High School, before joining Santa Clara University on a football scholarship, studying business and finance.

O’Brien’s biggest hit is Disney’s Hannah Montana, a concept he successfully pitched based on the premise of an incredibly famous teenager-with-a-double-life, an idea conceived during a tenure on Nickelodeon’s television series All That, where the (then) teenage American pop singer Britney Spears featured as a guest.

Aside from writing for television, O’Brien co-wrote Jerry Bruckheimer’s Kangaroo Jack, and two junior novels. He currently resides in Los Angeles, with his wife and two children.

Filmography

 Happy Days (1981-1982) (writer)
 Laverne & Shirley (1982) (writer)
 Joanie Loves Chachi (1982) (writer)
 The New Odd Couple (1983) (writer)
 Silver Spoons (1984) (writer)
 Muppet Babies (1985) (writer)
 MoonDreamers (1986) (writer)
 The Love Boat (1984-1986) (writer)
 Ghostbusters (1986) (writer)
 Blondie & Dagwood (1987) (writer)
 Pinocchio and the Emperor of the Night (1987) (writer)
 Beverly Hills Teens (1987) (writer, developer)
 The Jetsons (1987) (writer) 
 Fraggle Rock (1987) (writer) 
 BraveStarr (1987) (writer) 
 Alvin and the Chipmunks (1988) (writer) 
 She's the Sheriff (1987-1989) (writer) 
 Blondie & Dagwood: Second Wedding Workout (1989) (writer) 
 Perfect Strangers (1987-1993) (supervising producer, writer) 
 All-New Dennis the Menace (1993) (writer) 
 Getting By (1993-1994) (writer, co-executive producer)
 Taz-Mania (1995) (writer)
 Hangin' with Mr. Cooper (1995-1996) (co-executive producer, writer)
 Guys Like Us (1998) (executive producer, writer) 
 Between Brothers (1997-1999) (writer, executive producer, creator)
 Titans (2000-2001) (co-producer, writer) 
 Gary & Mike (2001) (writer)
 Judging Amy (2002-2005) (writer, supervising producer)
 Kangaroo Jack (2003) (writer)
 Drake & Josh (2004) (writer: story) (one episode; "Football")
 CSI: Miami (2005-2012) (writer, executive producer)
 Hannah Montana (2006-2011) (writer, creator)
 The Einstein Factor (2007-2008)  (supervising producer, writer, original concept)
 Touch (2013) (co-executive producer, writer)
 King & Maxwell (2013) (co-executive producer, writer)
 Intelligence (2014) (producer, writer)
 Dig (2015) (producer, writer)
 The Following (2015) (producer, writer)
 Castle (2015–16) (producer, writer)
 Gone (2017–18) (producer, writer)
 Lincoln Rhyme: Hunt for the Bone Collector (2020) (writer)
 Corn & Peg (2020) (writer)
 Law & Order: Organized Crime (2022-) (head writer)

Selected works

 Hannah Montana Bind Up #2 (Super Sneak/ Truth or Dare), with Laurie McElroy (Disney Press, 2009) 
 Ace London, with John Worsley, Kaj Melendez, and Mirza Javed (Fleetway Publications, 1962; Cuahtemoc Publishing Ltd, 2011)

Awards and nominations
Nominated for an Edgar Award for (the) Best Television Episode Teleplay of 2008. (CSI: Miami, You May Now Kill the Bride)

See also
Hannah Montana (Lawsuits)

References

Sources
 

American television writers
Living people
Place of birth missing (living people)
Santa Clara University alumni
American male screenwriters
American people of Irish descent
Television producers from California
Writers from San Francisco
1959 births
American male television writers
Screenwriters from California